John Berendt (born December 5, 1939) is an American author, known for writing the best-selling non-fiction book Midnight in the Garden of Good and Evil, which was a finalist for the 1995 Pulitzer Prize in General Nonfiction.

Biography
Berendt grew up in Syracuse, New York, where both of his parents were writers. As an English major at Harvard University, he worked on the staff of the Harvard Lampoon. He graduated in 1961 and moved to New York City to pursue a journalism career. He was an associate editor of Esquire from 1961 to 1969, editor of New York magazine from 1977 to 1979 and a columnist for Esquire from 1982 to 1994.

Berendt published Midnight in the Garden of Good and Evil in 1994 and became an overnight success; the book spent a record-breaking 216 weeks on the New York Times bestseller list — still, to this day, the longest standing best seller of the Times.

The story, unsettling and real, broke down the idea of the quintessential phenomenon of a true American city—only to reveal its quirks: its man walking an invisible dog; its voice of the drag queen; a high-society man in its elite community—all that somehow, unravels a murder mystery. Virtually seeming like a novel and reading like a tale, the non-fictional story is about the real-life events surrounding the murder trial of Jim Williams in Savannah, Georgia. Berendt acknowledged that he fabricated some scenes and changed the sequence of some events. The book was adapted into a 1997 film directed by Clint Eastwood. John Cusack plays John Kelso, a character loosely based on Berendt.

Berendt's second book, The City of Falling Angels, was published in September 2005. It chronicles interwoven lives in Venice in the aftermath of the fire that destroyed the La Fenice opera house. According to Kirkus Reviews, "Berendt does great justice to an exalted city that has rightly fascinated the likes of Henry James, Robert Browning, and many filmmakers throughout the world."

References

Further reading

Archival resources
 Esquire, Inc. Records 1933–1977 (26 linear feet) are housed at the Bentley Library at the University of Michigan. Contains correspondence with John Berendt.
 Larry McMurtry Collection, 1960–1976 (2.52 linear feet) is housed at the Harry Ransom Humanities Research Center of the University of Texas at Austin. Contains correspondence with John Berendt.

External links

1939 births
Living people
American columnists
American non-fiction crime writers
American magazine editors
Nottingham High School (Syracuse, New York) alumni
Harvard College alumni
Writers from Syracuse, New York
The Harvard Lampoon alumni
American gay writers
Lambda Literary Award winners
Journalists from New York (state)